The 9th radio centre of Moscow was a high power shortwave and medium wave broadcasting facility at Elektrostal near Moscow. Its broadcasting frequency was 873 kHz with a transmission power of up to 1200 kilowatts. It was also used as radio jammer of "unwanted" stations (VOA, BBC and others).

It used a system of four guyed masts each 217 metres tall, as the antenna system.

References
.

Buildings and structures in Moscow Oblast
Radio in Russia
Mass media in Moscow